Edgar Lewis (July 22, 1869 – May 21, 1938) was an American director.

Career
He began his career as a stage actor and entered the film industry in 1911 as an actor, making his directorial debut two years later. Specializing in action-adventure films and westerns, he directed dozens of pictures between 1913 and 1930, when he left directing and returned to his first love, acting. Most of his films during the sound era were in bit parts or uncredited roles. He appeared in his final film, Riding Wild in 1935 and retired. He died in Los Angeles in 1938.

Partial filmography

 The Thief (1914)
 The Governor (1915)
 Samson (1915)
 The Plunderer (1915)
 The Bondman (1916)
 Sherry  (1920)
 Lahoma  (1920)
 A Beggar in Purple (1920)
 Other Men's Shoes (1920)
 The Sage Hen  (1921)
 Strength of the Pines (1922)
 You Are Guilty (1923)
 The Right of the Strongest (1924)
 Red Love (1925)
 A Made-To-Order Hero (1927)
 One Glorious Scrap (1927)
 The Fearless Rider (1928)
 Put 'Em Up (1928)
 The Arizona Cyclone (1928)
 Stormy Waters (1928)
 Life's Crossroads (1928)
 The Gun Runner (1928)
 Unmasked (1929)
 Love at First Sight (1929)
 Ladies in Love (1930)

External links

1869 births
1938 deaths
American male silent film actors
American film directors
20th-century American male actors
American male stage actors